Locride is an area of Calabria, Italy around the town of Locri in the Province of Reggio Calabria. The term takes origin from the Locris, an ancient Greek region.

It is divided into 5 areas:
 Vallata dello Stilaro
 Vallata del Torbido
 Epizefiri
 Vallata del Bonamico
 Heracleum

See also 
 Bovesia
 Costa Viola
 Grande Reggio
 Piana di Gioia Tauro
 Costa dei gelsomini
 Locris
Italian page

References 

Province of Reggio Calabria